Following is a list of multimedia franchises originating in print publications, including literary works, comic books, and comic strips.

To qualify for purposes of this list, the original media must have originated from the work of an identifiable author or set of co-authors, and must have been adapted into works in at least three forms of media, and must have two or more separate works in at least two of those forms of media (a television series or comic book series is considered a single work for purposes of this list; multiple spin-off series or remakes of a previously ended series are considered multiple works). For example, a novel that spawned one film and one television series would not qualify; a series of novels made into a television series that had a spin-off series, or was remade as a new series, and which also spawned one film, does qualify.

In the following tables, the initial media through which the franchise characters or settings became known is shown in boldface. Only works of fiction are only considered part of the series; a book or a documentary film about the franchise is not itself an installment in the franchise.

Franchises originating in literary works
These franchises began as novels, short stories, and other forms of purely literary works.

Franchises originating in comics and printed cartoons

See also
 List of fictional shared universes in film and television – many multimedia franchises are based in fictional universes
 List of public domain works with multimedia adaptations
 List of highest-grossing media franchises
 Media mix

References

Lists of multimedia franchises